Ethaliella capillata is a species of small sea snail, a marine gastropod mollusk in the family Trochidae, the top snails.

Description
The height of the shell attains 4 mm, its diameter 8 mm. The small, smooth shell is convex on both sides. It is slender and angular. It is covered with green or rusty-brown lines that intersect in large numbers, and is ornate with bright striae. It consists of six planulate whorls that become sharp at the periphery. The sutures are scarcely impressed. The base of the shell is radially plicate. The umbilicus is small with a pale callus, surrounded by a rust-colored hollow. The small aperture is rhomboid. The outer lip is acute.

Distribution
This marine species occurs in the East China Sea.

References

 Higo, S., Callomon, P. & Goto, Y. (1999) Catalogue and Bibliography of the Marine Shell-Bearing Mollusca of Japan. Elle Scientific Publications, Yao, Japan, 749 pp

External links
 To World Register of Marine Species

capillata
Gastropods described in 1862